Fernwood is a census-designated place and unincorporated community in Pike County, Mississippi, United States. Its ZIP code is 39635.

It was first named as a CDP in the 2020 Census which listed a population of 286.

Demographics

2020 census

Note: the US Census treats Hispanic/Latino as an ethnic category. This table excludes Latinos from the racial categories and assigns them to a separate category. Hispanics/Latinos can be of any race.

History
Fernwood was developed in the late 1880s by the Enochs family as a company town for Fernwood Lumber Company.

Geography

Climate
The climate at Fernwood is characterized by relatively high temperatures and evenly distributed precipitation throughout the year.  The Köppen Climate Classification subtype for this climate is "Cfa". (Humid Subtropical Climate).

Notes

Unincorporated communities in Pike County, Mississippi
Unincorporated communities in Mississippi
Company towns in Mississippi
Census-designated places in Pike County, Mississippi